Bakersfield, California, held a general election for mayor on June 5, 2012. It saw the reelection of incumbent mayor Harvey Hall, who ran officially unopposed.

The election coincided with the California presidential primaries. Since Hall obtained a majority in the initial round of voting, no runoff was necessitated.

Municipal elections in California are officially non-partisan.

Results

References 

Bakersfield
Mayoral elections in Bakersfield, California
Bakersfield